Strmec (in older sources also Strmica) is a small dispersed settlement in the hills south of Črni Vrh in the Municipality of Idrija in the traditional Inner Carniola region of Slovenia.

Strmec belongs to the cadastral municipality of Kanji Dol. Strmec has 12 numbered houses with traditional oeconyms: pri Šemrl (or Vodnar; no. 1), Tič (no. 2), Cenck (no. 3), Medved (no. 4), Podobnik (no. 5), Peter (no. 6), Skokec (no. 7), Štorc (no. 8), Skalar (no. 9), Renk (no. 10), Zajc (no. 11), and Strmec (no. 12). The Skalar house is now in ruins and it is no longer officially numbered. It was assigned number 8  1823, but was reassigned the number 9 in 1959.

Gallery

References

External links
Strmec on Geopedia

Populated places in the Municipality of Idrija